John Gallagher Montgomery (June 27, 1805 – April 24, 1857) was an American lawyer from Danville, Pennsylvania. He represented Pennsylvania in the U.S. Congress briefly in 1857.

John Montgomery was born in Northumberland, Pennsylvania.  He studied under a private tutor, and graduated from Washington College (now Washington and Jefferson College) in Washington, Pennsylvania, in 1824.  He studied law, was admitted to the bar in 1827 and commenced practice in Danville.  He was a member of the Pennsylvania House of Representatives in 1855.

Montgomery was elected as a Democrat to the Thirty-fifth Congress and served until his death.  He attended the inauguration dinner for President Buchanan at the National Hotel where he was reported to have been deliberately poisoned  along with many other attendees.  This incident is now known as National Hotel Disease, and is believed to have been caused by food poisoning related to bad sanitation.  He returned home ill, and died at Danville five weeks later.
Interment at Episcopal Cemetery in Danville.  Cenotaph at Congressional Cemetery in Washington, D.C.

See also
List of United States Congress members who died in office (1790–1899)
List of United States Congress members killed or wounded in office

Sources

The Political Graveyard

1805 births
1857 deaths
19th-century American lawyers
19th-century American politicians
Burials at the Congressional Cemetery
Democratic Party members of the United States House of Representatives from Pennsylvania
Democratic Party members of the Pennsylvania House of Representatives
Pennsylvania lawyers
People from Danville, Pennsylvania
People from Northumberland, Pennsylvania
Washington & Jefferson College alumni